Two Mafiosi Against Goldfinger or Due mafiosi contro Goldginger is a 1965 Eurospy comedy film directed by Giorgio Simonelli starring the comic duo Franco and Ciccio. It is a spoof of the 1964 James Bond film, Goldfinger. It was picked up by American International Pictures and dubbed into English to be shown on their AIP-TV movie package as The Amazing Dr. G or Two Crazy Secret Agents.

Plot
After the British agent James Bond is killed, the cruel entrepreneur Goldginger plans to conquer the world using surrogate robots to be included in the various embassies policies in the world. In Sicily, two photographers, bungling Franco and Ciccio, who discovered Goldginger's plan, are captured by him because they possess secret information picked up by James Bond before he died.

Immediately, the comedy and the rift with the world of 007 become apparent to the viewer. In fact, while James Bond had his licence to kill, when the two Sicilian friends are captured, Ciccio presents himself: "Pleasure: I'm Ciccio Pecora. Primary school!" (Piacere: sono Ciccio Pecora. Licenza elementare!). Goldginger, as in the famous scene from the original film, tries to divide Franco and Ciccio into two with the laser beam, but the two try to dissuade him from his idea. In fact, for example, they say that dividing the two of them becomes four pieces and then for the burial Goldginger will have to spend a lot more money for the flowers and coffins. Ciccio had to leave to Goldginger the secret of James Bond, is released together with Franco and so, after a while, the two friends manage to escape with the help of Marlene. Disguised as African shamans and after gaining experience in the army, Franco and Ciccio are ready to face new Goldginger in his secret lair: a factory of ginger soda soft drinks.

Cast
 Franco Franchi as Franco Pecora
 Ciccio Ingrassia as Ciccio Pecora
 Gloria Paul as Marlene
 Fernando Rey as Goldginger / Dr. G / Dr. Goldginger
 Andrea Bosic as Colonel Herrman
 Rosalba Neri as The Secretary (as Sara Bay)
 Dakar as Molok
 George Hilton as Agent 007
 Giampiero Littera as Dupont
 Barbara Nelli as Miss Dupont
 John Karlsen as White
 Mario Pennisi as Istructor
 Les Bluebell Girls as Dancing group
 Luis Peña
 Alfredo Mayo

External links
 

1965 films
1960s Italian-language films
1960s buddy comedy films
Italian parody films
1960s spy comedy films
Italian spy comedy films
Mafia comedy films
Films directed by Giorgio Simonelli
Films about photographers
Films scored by Piero Umiliani
Italian buddy comedy films
Parody films based on James Bond films
1960s parody films
1965 comedy films
1960s American films
1960s Italian films